Tuojiangosaurus (meaning "Tuo River lizard") is a genus of herbivorous stegosaurian dinosaur from the Late Jurassic Period, recovered from the Upper Shaximiao Formation of what is now Sichuan Province in China.

Description

Physically similar to the North American Stegosaurus, Tuojiangosaurus is the best understood of the Chinese stegosaurs.

In 1977, Dong provided a diagnosis but this largely consisted of traits shared with other stegosaurus. In 1990, Peter Malcolm Galton pointed out an autapomorphy: the spines of the vertebrae of the tail base possess spines with bony skirts running from their front to the sides.

Tuojiangosaurus has the typical narrow and low head, bulky body, and low teeth of other stegosaurids. The limbs, especially the arms, are rather short. There are at least twenty-five dentary teeth. The teeth have a thick base, cingulum, merging at the inside into a triangular vertical median ridge. The dorsal vertebrae have tall neural arches. The shoulder blade has a rectangular acromion.

 
Like Kentrosaurus, Tuojiangosaurus had two rows of plates along the spine, which became taller over the hip region. Those at the neck and front trunk were rounded or pear-shaped; the plates at the rear back became more triangular and pointed. All plates have a thickened central section, as if they were modified spikes. Dong estimated there were about seventeen pairs of plates and spikes. Tuojiangosaurus had at least two outward-pointing, rather robust, spikes on each side of the end of the tail, angled at approximately 45 degrees to the vertical. In stegosauridae, this spike arrangement has become affectionately known as the "thagomizer". Dong thought it were possible that there were four pairs of spikes. Paul, based on "Chungkingosaurus sp. 3" specimen CV 00208, interpreted the thagomizer as a "pin-cushion array", with two vertical pairs of thick spikes and a third pair of narrow spikes pointing to behind.

Discovery

In 1974, during construction of the Wujiaba dam in Zigong, Sichuan, the remains of a stegosaurian were found.

The type and only species of Tuojiangosaurus, Tuojiangosaurus multispinus, was named and described in 1977 (exactly a hundred years after the naming of Stegosaurus by Othniel Charles Marsh) by Dong Zhiming, Zhou Shiwu, Li Xuanmin and Chang Yijong. The generic name is derived from the River Tuo. The specific name is derived from Latin multus, "many", and spina, "spine".

The holotype, CV 209, was found in a layer of the Upper Shaximiao Formation, dating from the Oxfordian-Kimmeridgian. It consists of a rather complete skeleton that however lacks parts of the skull, lower jaws, tail and limbs. In 1977, it represented the most complete stegosaurian skeleton found in Asia. The paratype was specimen CV 210, a sacrum. Subsequently, more material has been referred, including juveniles. This complemented the holotype with elements of the skull, especially the braincase, and the lower jaws.

A mounted skeleton of Tuojiangosaurus multispinus is on display at the Municipal Museum of Chongqing. In addition, a mounted cast is on display at the Natural History Museum, in London. Another mount is displayed in the Beijing Museum of Natural History in a conflict with Yangchuanosaurus. A cast of the original fossilised dinosaur skeleton, found at Wujiaba Quarry 1977 is also on display at Bolton Museum, United Kingdom.

Classification
Tuojiangosaurus was by Dong placed in Stegosauridae in 1977, more precisely in the Stegosaurinae. In 2004, a cladistic analysis by Galton recovered Tuojiangosaurus in a rather derived position, as a sister species of Chialingosaurus. An analysis by Octávio Mateus, Maidment, and Nicolai Christiansen, published in 2009, found that Tuojiangosaurus fell outside of Stegosauridae, though its exact position in Stegosauria (either as an early branching member of the group or a later branching species closer to stegosaurids) was uncertain due to the relatively fragmentary nature of the remains.<ref>Mateus, Maidment and Christiansen (2009). "A new long-necked ‘sauropod-mimic’ stegosaur and the evolution of the plated dinosaurs", Proc Biol Sci. 2009 May 22; 276(1663): 1815–1821.</ref> A more comprehensive analysis by Raven and Maidment in 2017 found that it grouped with Huayangosaurus and its relatives.

Paleobiology Tuojiangosaurus ate low-lying, ground vegetation. Paul suggested that Chialingosaurus and Chungkingosaurus were in fact the juveniles of Tuojiangosaurus''.

See also

 Timeline of stegosaur research

Notes

References

External links

Natural History Museum on Tuojiangosaurus

Late Jurassic dinosaurs of Asia
Stegosaurs
Taxa named by Dong Zhiming
Fossil taxa described in 1977
Paleontology in Sichuan
Ornithischian genera